The Treaty of Roskilde (concluded on 26 February (OS), or 8 March 1658) (NS) during the Second Northern War between Frederick III of Denmark–Norway and Karl X Gustav of Sweden in the Danish city of Roskilde. After a devastating defeat, Denmark–Norway was forced to give up a third of its territory to save the rest, the ceded lands comprising Blekinge, Bornholm, Bohuslän (Båhuslen), Scania (Skåne) and Trøndelag, as well as her claims to Halland.

After the treaty entered into force, Swedish forces continued to campaign in the remainder of Denmark–Norway, but had to withdraw from the Danish isles and Trøndelag in face of a Danish–Norwegian–Dutch alliance. The Treaty of Copenhagen restored Bornholm to Denmark and Trøndelag to Norway in 1660, while the other provinces transferred in Roskilde remained Swedish.

Background

As the Northern Wars progressed, Charles X Gustav of Sweden crossed the frozen straits from Jutland and occupied the Danish island of Zealand, with the invasion beginning on 11 February 1658. A preliminary treaty, the Treaty of Taastrup, was signed on 18 February 1658 with the final treaty, the Treaty of Roskilde, signed on 26 February 1658.

Although Sweden also invaded Romsdal in western Norway, the local farmers rebelled and defied the Swedish taxes and military conscription vigorously. The Swedish governor was forced to send a full company of soldiers and 50 cavalry to collect taxes. The action was not successful, and the area remained largely autonomous.

Provisions

The treaty's conditions included:
The immediate cession of the Danish province Scania (Skåne) to Sweden.
The immediate cession of the Danish province Blekinge to Sweden.
The immediate cession of the Danish province Halland, which under the terms of the Peace of Brömsebro, negotiated in 1645 was then occupied by Sweden for a term of 30 years, to Sweden.
The immediate cession of the Danish province of Bornholm to Sweden.
The immediate cession of the Norwegian province of Bohuslän (Båhuslen) to Sweden. This effectively secured for Sweden unrestricted access to western trade.
The immediate cession of the Norwegian province of Trøndelag, then including Nordmøre and Romsdal, to Sweden.
Danish renunciation of all anti-Swedish alliances.
Danish prevention of any warships hostile to Sweden passing through the straits into the Baltic.
Restoration of the Duke of Holstein-Gottorp to his estates.
Danish payment for Swedish occupation forces costs.
Danish provision of troops to serve Charles in his broader wars.

Aftermath

Copenhagen

The Swedish king was not content with his stunning victory, and at the Swedish Council held at Gottorp on 7 July, Charles X Gustav resolved to wipe his inconvenient rival from the map of Europe. Without any warning, in defiance of international treaty, he ordered his troops to attack Denmark–Norway a second time. There followed an attack on the capital Copenhagen, whose residents successfully defended themselves with help from the Dutch, who honored their 1649 treaty to defend Denmark against unprovoked invasion by sending an expeditionary fleet and army, defeating the Swedish fleet in the Battle of the Sound and relieving the capital. His army partly trapped at Landskrona and partly isolated on the Danish islands by superior Danish and Dutch forces under Vice-Admiral Michiel de Ruyter, Charles was forced to withdraw in 1659.

Bornholm and Trøndelag

Meanwhile, Norwegian forces succeeded in expelling the Swedish occupiers from Trøndelag. Eventually, the resulting Treaty of Copenhagen in 1660 restored Trøndelag to Norway, and also the island of Bornholm to Denmark.

The relinquishment of Trøndelag by the Treaty of Copenhagen reflects strong local resistance to the Swedish occupation. Although the Swedish invasion had been welcomed, or at least not resisted, the Swedes issued conscription orders in Trøndelag and forced 2000 men and boys down to 15 years of age to join the Swedish armies fighting in Poland and Brandenburg. King Carl X Gustav was afraid that the Trønders would rise against their Swedish occupiers, and thought it wise to keep a large part of the men away. Only about one third of the men ever returned to their homes. Some of them were forced to settle in the Swedish province of Estonia, as the Swedes thought it would be easier to rule the Trønders there. Many of Trøndelag's men were already in the Dano-Norwegian army and navy, so the Swedish-forced conscription nearly emptied Trøndelag of males. The result was devastating, as the farms were left without enough hands to harvest the fields, and famine struck the region. Some local historians of Trøndelag have termed this the genocide of the Trønders.

The few months of experience with Swedish taxation and conscription left such bitter sentiments that it served to strengthen Dano-Norwegian unity and patriotism, making resistance to Swedish invasions of Denmark–Norway stronger over the next 80 years.

Scania

According to the ninth article of the Treaty of Roskilde, which ceded Scania (Skåne), the inhabitants of the Scanian lands were assured of their privileges, old laws and customs. However the territories were gradually integrated in the Swedish realm. The nobility was soon amalgamated with the Swedish nobility and introduced into the Swedish House of Lords with the same rights and privileges as the original Swedish noble families. The provincial Scanian Law was replaced by the national Swedish law in 1683. In the same year the national Danish law came into force in Denmark, also replacing provincial laws there. The Swedish Church Ordinance was introduced in 1686.

See also
Dominium maris baltici
Dano-Swedish War (1657–58)
List of treaties

References

External links
Freden i Roskilde at the Danish-language Wikisource
Scan of the treaty at IEG Mainz
Transcription of the treaty at IEG Mainz

Second Northern War
Northern Wars
Roskilde
Roskilde
Roskilde
1658 in Denmark
1658 treaties
Treaties of the Swedish Empire
Treaties of Denmark–Norway
History of Bohuslän
1658 in Sweden
History of Roskilde
History of Scania
17th century in Skåne County